Stopwatch and Listen is a Canadian comedy television series which aired on CBC Television in 1952.

Premise
This mockumentary series was based on a 1951 programme on CBC Radio's Trans-Canada Network. All aspects of the production were managed by producer Ross McLean. He chose a theme such as feature films or telephones six weeks prior to airdate then conducted rehearsals on the resulting scripts four weeks later. This culminated in a live broadcast of that episode.

Stopwatch and Listen was one of CBC's very first regular TV series, debuting the week the TV network went on the air.  It not a success, with Peter Gzowski opining "it may well have been the most catastrophic flop in CBC history and which left the air in a flurry of bad taste."  (The final broadcast, which like all episodes in this series was broadcast live, apparently included some ad-libs that were considered to be off-colour by 1952 standards.)  A contemporary review by Alex Barris after the first broadcast noted that the show suffered from "poor timing - on the part of the producer", but praised cast members Sam Aaron and Barbara Hamilton. A few weeks later, Gordon Sinclair of The Toronto Star reported Stopwatch and Listen was cancelled "because it was so unfunny...[and] was replaced by a concert last night."

Producer Ross McLean later wrote that the show was "nothing but a trauma".

Scheduling
This half-hour series debut was broadcast on Fridays at 9:00 p.m. (Eastern) from 12 September to 10 October 1952. Its time slot was filled by CBC Concert after this.

References

External links
 
 

CBC Television original programming
1950s Canadian comedy television series
1952 Canadian television series debuts
1952 Canadian television series endings
Black-and-white Canadian television shows